Thick as Thieves (also known as The Code) is a 2009 American/German heist action thriller film directed by Mimi Leder, starring Morgan Freeman, Antonio Banderas, and Radha Mitchell. The film was released direct-to-DVD on April 17, 2009 in the United States and on October 18, 2010 in Germany.

Plot
In New York, veteran thief Keith Ripley recruits younger crook Gabriel Martin to help him pull off one final job in order to repay his debt to the Russian mafia, who had killed his previous partner, Victor Korolenko, before they could complete the plan. Martin is unsure of Ripley, but Ripley's goddaughter, Alexandra Korolenko, who is Victor's daughter, convinces him otherwise, although Ripley does not like that the two are getting close. Ripley tells Martin the plan, that they are going to steal from a Russian museum that has been smuggling Russian treasures into the country and bribing the NYPD with large donations and expensive equipment. The two infiltrate a party at the museum posing as cops, with Ripley as Lt. Weber, who has a vendetta against Ripley, to gather information about their vault.

The Russian mob, led by Nicky Petrovitch, grow impatient and kidnap Alexandra, telling Ripley he must steal two Fabergé eggs from the Russian Museum in order to get her back. When the duo get into the vaults of the museum with the eggs, Martin reveals he is an undercover cop from Miami planted by Weber to catch Ripley, leaves Ripley locked in the vault and informs Weber, while taking the eggs to the Russian mobster to free Alexandra. After Alexandra is released, Martin is forced to meet with Petrovitch, who reveals that the eggs they have stolen are made of wood. Meanwhile, Weber and his squad enter the museum, but are detained by the security guards due to Martin telling the guards he was a cop as he escaped.

Martin reports in to the police the next morning, after the police have picked up Petrovitch, only to learn that the man they have in custody is not the man Martin met, and that the man he met was actually Victor Korolenko, who had faked his death with Ripley's help. It is then revealed that Ripley had escaped, letting the museum know cops were on the way and that they had cleaned out the vault of all the smuggled items (which had included the eggs) before the police could inspect it, meaning there was no evidence that anything had been stolen and that Martin's testimony would be worthless as his actions have been kept off the book to prevent Ripley from finding out. Martin's involvement with Alex compromises him, and Ripley had to be let go.

Ripley later calls Martin from an airport tarmac, ready to leave with Victor to meet with a buyer for the eggs; to tell him that they knew Martin was a cop from the beginning. Martin later meets up with Alex, who remained in New York, and who confesses that her feelings for him are real. Martin decides to become a thief.

Cast

Reception
On Rotten Tomatoes the film has an approval rating of 20% based on reviews from 5 critics.

David Nusair of Reel Film Reviews gave the film 2.5/4 and called it "...a hopelessly uneven endeavor that's consistently buoyed by Freeman's mere presence...".

Dragan Antulov of Draxblog Movie Reviews gave it 3/10 and wrote: "The sadness created by this film could be cured only by its quick descent in well-deserved oblivion."
Jason McKiernan at Filmcritic.com called it "sloppy, lazy, and unable to keep up with its own con."
David Cornelius at DVDTalk.com wrote: "Don't let the big names fool you: The Code is limp enough a thriller to deserve the direct-to-video treatment it's received."

References

External links
 
Thick as Thieves at Rotten Tomatoes

2009 direct-to-video films
2009 films
2009 action films
2000s crime thriller films
2000s heist films
American action thriller films
American heist films
Films directed by Mimi Leder
Films scored by Atli Örvarsson
Films shot in New York City
Films set in New York City
Films shot in Bulgaria
MoviePass Films films
Fictional portrayals of the New York City Police Department
Films about the New York City Police Department
2000s English-language films
2000s American films